Catherine E. Falvey was an American Democratic politician from Somerville, Massachusetts. She represented the 24th Middlesex district in the Massachusetts House of Representatives from 1941 to 1944.

See also
 1941-1942 Massachusetts legislature
 1943-1944 Massachusetts legislature

References

Year of birth missing
Year of death missing
Members of the Massachusetts House of Representatives
Women state legislators in Massachusetts
20th-century American women politicians
20th-century American politicians
People from Somerville, Massachusetts